Bilbao BBK Live is a rock and pop music festival that takes place annually in the city of Bilbao, Spain. Since its beginnings, the festival is held in its entirety on a special complex built specifically for the event on the slopes of Mount Cobetas, located southwest of the city.

The first edition was organized by Basque musical promoter Last Tour International and sponsored by the Bilbao City Council in the year 2006 under the name Bilbao Live Festival. Since the following year, the festival has been sponsored by local savings bank Bilbao Bizkaia Kutxa, who gave it its current name. The festival is the first of its kind and size to happen in the region. In the 2011 edition, the festival exceeded 100,000 visitors for the first time, doubling the 2006 attendance. The 2012 event was reported to left an economical impact estimated in over 17.5 million euros in the city.

The festival was nominated for "Best Foreign Festival" at the UK Festival Awards in 2010 and 2011, and for "Best Medium-Sized European Festival" at the European Festivals Awards three consecutive times in 2009–2011.

History

Organization and first edition 
After an unsuccessful attempt to establish a street circuit in the city for the Formula Renault 3.5 in July 2005, the city Government decided to fill in the summer events calendar with an open-air music festival. In early 2006, it approached local musical promoter Last Tour International, responsible for the organization of the Azkena Rock Festival, celebrated in nearby Vitoria-Gasteiz since 2002. The newborn festival received the name of Bilbao Live Festival, and had a budget of 4.2 million euros. The newly developed area in mount Cobetas was chosen as the location, which included two main stages for the rock acts, two electronic music tents, one pop music tent, and several bars and shops. Over 40 national and international bands participated in the first edition, celebrated during three days between 13 and 15 July 2006. The headliners included American hard rock band Guns N' Roses, British bands Placebo and Pretenders, and Argentinians Andrés Calamaro and Ariel Roth, former members of rock band Los Rodríguez.

Over 51,000 people attended this first edition, and was considered a "success". LTI representative, Alfonso Santiago praised the organization and the music acts, and defined the festival as a "good starting point". The festival was well received by critics, the authorities, and the general public, and a second edition for the next year was confirmed on 28 July 2006, with the possibility of making it a "permanent musical event" of the city's cultural offer.

BBK sponsorship and consolidation 

In early 2007, local savings bank Bilbao Bizkaia Kutxa decided to become an official sponsor for the festival, as part of the actions for its 100th anniversary celebration campaign. As a result, the festival's name was changed to Bilbao BBK Live. Unlike other sponsorship renamings, where the sponsor's name is usually dropped in an informal context, this festival is commonly referred to as "the BBK Live" or simply "the BBK". The second edition enjoyed a "significant budget rise", and the area designated for the stages and camping was also increased from 70,000 to 110,000 m2. The 2007 edition was also the first (and currently only) to be celebrated in June, a decision took based on the "European summer festival calendar". An extra date was also added, spanning two weekends, 21-22 and 28–29 June. American bands Red Hot Chili Peppers, Metallica, Incubus, New York Dolls, My Chemical Romance, and British heavy metal band Iron Maiden were among the international headliners for this edition, meanwhile local rock band Fito & Fitipaldis stood out among Spanish acts, and received the largest audience of the event. Over 95,000 people attended the event, and produced an economical impact estimated in 13 million euros.

For the 2008 edition, the festival moved back to its original dates in the first weekend of July and a three-day programme. This edition was headlined by American acts R.E.M., Lenny Kravitz, ZZ Top, and British bands The Police, The Prodigy, and Madness. This year saw the introduction of a new festival in the city; Kobetasonik was focused in heavy metal music, was headlined by Kiss and Judas Priest, and was held two weeks before BBK Live in the same venue at mount Cobetas. Bilbao BBK Live 08 was attended by a little less than 80,000 people, well below the expected 95,000. Rain and difficult access to the site, available only through shuttle buses provided by a private party instead of the city's public buses as in past editions, were seen as factors for the decrease in attendance. However, the edition was still considered a success, and despite a project of moving the festival to a new location at an abandoned amusement park in mount Artxanda, the organization decided to stick to Cobetas, and promised improvements in the area and services for 2009.

The fourth edition, held between 9–11 July 2009 suffered greatly from the financial crisis that struck Spain in that period. As a result, the line-up was considerately "less commercial", as defined by the organization. Headliners included Depeche Mode, Jane's Addiction, Kaiser Chiefs, Editors, and second-timers Placebo, among others. The festival received over 52,600 visitors, a "foreseen decrease", and although considered a "step back", the continuity of the festival was confirmed. This edition saw an increase of foreign visitors, a 5-point increase from the past edition, totaling 14,6%. Foreign attendees came principally from France and the United Kingdom. This was mainly due to a special offer aimed to anyone with a postal address outside of Spain, with a three-day ticket for £40, one third of the standard price.

Lineups by year

2006 
Number of visitors: 51.000

2007 
Number of visitors: 94.712

2008 
Number of visitors: 79.810

2009 
Number of visitors: 52.663

2010 
Number of visitors: 76.579

2011 
Number of visitors: 103.083

2012 
Number of visitors: 110.000

2013 
Number of visitors: 105.000

2014 
Number of visitors: 120.000

2015 
Number of visitors: 120.000

2016 
Number of visitors: 102.865

2017 
Number of visitors: 112.114

2018

2019

Impact 
The 2012 edition is said to have left an economical impact estimated in over 17.5 million euros, taking into account the expenditures of the general public, organization, sponsors, and artists during the three days of the festival. This indicates an increase of 1.3 million when compared to the previous edition. During festival days, the city's hotels had an occupancy rate of 95%. LTI spokesman, Alfonso Santiago, stated that Bilbao has established itself as the third Spanish concert capital, behind Madrid and Barcelona.

Along with Aste Nagusia, the local patronage festival held each August, BBK Live is often cited as an important component of the city's cultural offer, and responsible for the 200,000 tourists that Bilbao receives each summer. Many travel agencies offer special packages with transportation, accommodation and festival tickets.

Venue 

Bilbao BBK Live is an open-air festival that takes place at Kobetamendi, located in Mount Cobetas, southeast from the city centre. With , it is Bilbao's largest park. The venue is built each year around a 110,000 m2 area and features three main stages, a DJs Tent, VIP zone, backstage facilities, food and drinks markets, and two camping areas, that total  and have a total capacity of 15,000 people.

Bilbao BBK Live Bereziak 
Since 2011, the organization decided to arrange a series of spin-off concerts to be held at Sala BBK, a small venue located at the centre of the city, on the Gran Vía, the city's main street. Under the name Bilbao BBK Live Bereziak (Basque: Bilbao BBK Live Specials), it consists of a cycle of small profile concerts with a very limited capacity, distributed along the year. Among the artists that participated in this specials are: Lambchop, M. Ward, and Tortoise.

References

External links

 Official site 
 Last Tour International

Music festivals in Spain
Tourist attractions in Bilbao
Recurring events established in 2006
Basque culture
Electronic music festivals in Spain
2006 establishments in Spain
Annual events in Spain
Basque festivals
Summer events in Spain